Bruno Gonçalo Fernandes Silva (born 4 May 1991 in Faro) is a professional footballer who currently plays as a fullback for Almancilense in the Campeonato de Portugal.
He joined Almancilense from Martimo as a free agent in the summer of 2015. Since then, he has played 18 games for the club, scoring 2 goals.

Football career
On 30 November 2014, Silva made his professional debut with Marítimo B in a 2014–15 Segunda Liga match against Santa Clara.

References

External links

Stats and profile at LPFP 

1991 births
Living people
People from Faro, Portugal
Portuguese footballers
Association football defenders
S.R. Almancilense players
Louletano D.C. players
Campeonato de Portugal (league) players
Liga Portugal 2 players
Sportspeople from Faro District